The Daily Compilation of Presidential Documents collection is composed of the Daily Compilation of Presidential Documents and its predecessor, the Weekly Compilation of Presidential Documents*. Since 1993, it has been published by the Office of the Federal Register, National Archives and Records Administration (NARA) under the authority of the Federal Register Act (44 U.S.C. Ch. 15; 1 CFR part 10).

This FDsys collection integrates material from the weekly publication dating from 1993, with Daily Compilation material as published from January 20, 2009 forward. The website is updated frequently, as information is released by the White House press office to Federal Register editors. Documents appearing in the Compilation of Presidential Documents collection are edited for accuracy and annotated with additional information to provide an authoritative record of the Presidency. It includes such material as:
 Proclamations
 Executive orders
 Speeches
 Press conferences
 Communications to Congress and Federal agencies
 Statements regarding bill signings and vetoes
 Appointments and nominations
 Reorganization plans
 Resignations
 Retirements
 Acts approved by the President
 Nominations submitted to the Senate
 White House announcements
 Press releases

References

National Archives and Records Administration